Chelis marxi is a moth in the family Erebidae. It was described by Otto Bang-Haas in 1927. It is found in Himachal Pradesh, India.

This species was moved from the genus Palearctia to Chelis as a result of phylogenetic research published in 2016.

References

Moths described in 1927
Arctiina
Taxa named by Otto Bang-Haas